Roimontis is a genus of small air-breathing land snails, terrestrial pulmonate gastropod mollusks in the family Charopidae.

Species
Species within the genus Roimontis include:
 Roimontis tolotomensis

References

 Taxonomicon info

 
Charopidae
Taxonomy articles created by Polbot